The 2016–17 Hertha BSC season was the 125th season in the football club's history and fourth consecutive and 34th overall season in the top flight of German football, the Bundesliga, having been promoted from the 2. Bundesliga in 2013. Hertha BSC also participated in this season's edition of the domestic cup, the DFB-Pokal. It was the 49th overall season for Hertha BSC in the Olympiastadion, located in Berlin, Germany. The season covered a period from 1 July 2016 to 30 June 2017.

Background
Hertha finished seventh in the 2015–16 Bundesliga, earning them qualification to the 2016–17 Europa League third qualifying round.

Players

Squad

Transfers

In

Out

Friendly matches

Schauinsland-Reisen-Cup

Competitions

Overview

Bundesliga

League table

Results summary

Results by round

Matches

DFB-Pokal

UEFA Europa League

Third qualifying round

Statistics

Appearances and goals

|-
! colspan=14 style=background:#dcdcdc; text-align:center| Goalkeepers

|-
! colspan=14 style=background:#dcdcdc; text-align:center| Defenders

|-
! colspan=14 style=background:#dcdcdc; text-align:center| Midfielders

|-
! colspan=14 style=background:#dcdcdc; text-align:center| Forwards

|-
! colspan=14 style=background:#dcdcdc; text-align:center| Players transferred out during the season

Goalscorers

Last updated: 20 May 2017

Clean sheets

Last updated: 13 May 2017

Disciplinary record

Last updated: 20 May 2017

References

Hertha BSC
Hertha BSC seasons
Hertha BSC